USCGC John Midgett (WHEC-726), previously USCGC Midgett (WHEC-726), was the twelfth and latest of the United States Coast Guard's fleet of  high endurance cutters. With her crew of 24 officers and 160 enlisted men and women, she was homeported in Seattle, Washington under the operational and administrative control of Commander, Pacific Area (COMPACAREA). Prior to Fleet Renovation and Maintenance (FRAM), the Midgett's homeport was Alameda, California.

Coast Guard Cutter Midgetts keel was laid April 5, 1971 at the Avondale Shipyard in New Orleans, Louisiana, and she was launched on September 4, 1971. She was commissioned on March 17, 1972. She had another commissioning ceremony on August 21, 1972 at Treasure Island in San Francisco Bay. This was soon after reaching her first home port of Alameda, California. The Midgett was decommissioned and placed in Fleet Renovation and Maintenance (FRAM) on January 7, 1991 and was placed in "In Commission Special" status as of April 25, 1992. She was fully re-commissioned in February 1993. She was a multipurpose ship, designed to meet the many and varied missions of today's Coast Guard. Her responsibilities included Homeland Security, Search and Rescue, Maritime Law Enforcement, and Alien Migrant Interdiction Operations as well as maintaining military readiness in support of NATO allies and the U.S. Navy. One of ten high endurance cutters on the west coast, her normal patrol areas included the Bering Sea, Gulf of Alaska and Central American waters, enforcing the Magnuson Fishery Conservation and Management Act ( limit) and drug interdiction laws.

The Midgett appears on the cover of the 1979 Jefferson Starship album Freedom at Point Zero.

On 14 August 2020 the ship was transferred to the Vietnam Coast Guard and was commissioned as coastguard ship CSB 8021, joining its sister ship, the former USCGC Morgenthau (WHEC-722), now coastguard ship CSB 8020'''.

NamesakeMidgett was the third ship in her class (HERO) to be named for outstanding Coast Guardsmen. Her namesake, the late Chief Warrant Officer John Allen "BOSN/Bosun" Midgett, Jr. was born in 1876 in Rodanthe, North Carolina, and served for nearly forty years with the United States Life-Saving Service and the Coast Guard. He was awarded the Gold Lifesaving Medal, the country's highest award for saving a life, for his heroic rescue of thirty six crewmen from the torpedoed British tanker Mirlo in 1918. Bos'n Midgett and his lifeboat crew rescued the entire crew, despite rough seas and flames from the tanker's cargo of refined oil and gasoline.

The Midgett family (earlier spelled Midgette and Midyett) has lived along the coast of Virginia and the Outer Banks of North Carolina for nearly three centuries, and has a long tradition in maritime service. John Allen "Bos'n" Midgett, Jr. was one of seven Midgett family members to have been awarded the Gold Lifesaving Medal. More than 150 living members of the Midgett family have made the Coast Guard a career, including more than thirty who are still on active duty.

USCGC Midgett characteristics

Length: 
Beam: 
Draft: 
Max Speed: 
Econ Speed: 
Max Range: 
Displacement: 
Fuel Capacity: 
Water Capacity: 
Helo Fuel Capacity: 

Engines
2 Fairbanks Morse diesel engines 12 cylinders ( each)
2 Pratt-Whitney gas turbines
2 Controllable pitch propellers
1 Variable pitch/ Variable thrust, 360deg bow propulsion system

Successor Midgett
As the Hero class cutters continue to be retired, the name Midgett'' will remain in use with USCGC Midgett (WMSL-757), a Legend-class National Security Cutter currently in service after being commissioned on August 24, 2019.

References

External links

Ships of the United States Coast Guard
Hamilton-class cutters
1971 ships
Ships built in Bridge City, Louisiana
Hamilton-class cutters of the Vietnam Coast Guard